Bellamy is a surname of Norman origin, from the words beau/bel (good, fair, handsome) and
'ami' (friend, Companion, Kinsman). Ultimately deriving from the Latin "Bellum"/"Bellus" and "Amicus".
It could also be a local surname meaning 'from Belleme'.

Notable people with the surname include:

 Arthur Bellamy (1942–2014), English footballer
 Béatrice Bellamy (born 1966), French politician
 Benjamin Bellamy (1891–1985), English first-class cricketer
 Benjamin Plim Bellamy (1782–1847), English thespian
 Bert Bellamy (1896–1978), English footballer
 Bill Bellamy (born 1965), American actor, stand-up comedian, and MTV host
 Carol Bellamy (born 1942), American activist
 Charles Bellamy (fl.1717–1720), English pirate
 Charlotte Bellamy (born 1973), English actress
 Craig Bellamy (born 1979), Welsh footballer
 Craig Bellamy (rugby league) (born 1959), Australian rugby league coach
 Daniel Bellamy, the elder (born 1687), English writer
 Daniel Bellamy, the younger (died 1788), English writer and divine
 David Bellamy (1933–2019), British botanist and writer
 Davin Bellamy (born 1994), American football player
 Denise Bellamy, Canadian judge
 Dodie Bellamy (born 1951), American writer
 Earl Bellamy (1917–2003), American television and film director
 Edward Bellamy (1850–1898), American journalist, utopian, and writer of speculative fiction
 Francis Bellamy (disambiguation), multiple people
 François-Xavier Bellamy (born 1985), French philosopher and politician
 Frank Bellamy (1917–1976), British comics artist
 George Bellamy (disambiguation), multiple people
 Gordon Bellamy (born 1970), American game developer
 Hans Schindler Bellamy (1901–1982), Austrian author
 Jacobus Bellamy (1757–1786), Dutch poet
 James Bellamy (disambiguation), multiple people
 Jay Bellamy (born 1972), American football player
 Jerome Bellamy (died 1568), English Catholic
 John Bellamy (disambiguation), multiple people
 Joseph Bellamy (1719–1790), American theologian
 Josh Bellamy (born 1989), American football player
 Leslie Ballamy (1903–1991), automobile engineer, designer of split front suspension
 LeVante Bellamy (born 1996), American football player
 Madge Bellamy (1899–1990), American actress
 Matt Bellamy (born 1978), singer and guitarist with the rock band Muse
 Mike Bellamy (born 1966), American football player
 Ned Bellamy (born 1957), American actor
 Peter Bellamy (1944–1991), British musician
 Ralph Bellamy (1904–1991), American actor
 Richard Bellamy (disambiguation), multiple people
 Ron Bellamy (born 1964), American professional boxer
 Samuel Bellamy (1689–1717), also known as "Black Sam" Bellamy, early 18th-century pirate captain
 Sarah Bellamy (1770–1843), a convict on the First Fleet to Australia. 
 Steven Bellamy (born 1950), British martial artist
 Thomas Bellamy (disambiguation), multiple people
 Tom Bellamy (born 1980), singer with The Cooper Temple Clause
 Tony Bellamy (1946–2009), lead guitarist, pianist and vocalist of the 1970s band Redbone
 Vic Bellamy (born 1963), American football player
 Walt Bellamy (1939–2013), American basketball player

See also 
Bellamy (disambiguation), which includes among other things some fictional people called Bellamy

English-language surnames
French-language surnames
Surnames of Norman origin